The following is a list of episodes for the detective television series Mannix which aired from 1967 to 1975 in the United States on the CBS television network. The title character, Joe Mannix, is an Armenian-American private investigator played by Mike Connors (who was also of Armenian heritage). Mannix was created by Richard Levinson and William Link and developed by executive producer Bruce Geller (who also created Mission: Impossible).

Series overview

Episodes

Season 1 (1967–1968)

Season 2 (1968–1969)

Season 3 (1969–1970)

Season 4 (1970–1971)

Season 5 (1971–1972)

Season 6 (1972–1973)

Season 7 (1973–1974)

Season 8 (1974–1975)

References

 
 
1970-1982 Episode Guide for 'Mannix' from Ultimate70s.com

Lists of American crime drama television series episodes